The Duchess of Argyll is typically the wife of the Duke of Argyll, an extant title in the Peerage of the United Kingdom created in 1892. The Duke is also Duke of Argyll in the Peerage of Scotland, which was originally created in the 1701.

The family seat is Inveraray Castle near Inveraray in the county of Argyll, in western Scotland.

Duchesses of Argyll

Peerage of Scotland (1701)
 Elizabeth Tollemache (1659–1735), wife of the 1st Duke
 Mary Brown (died 1717), 1st wife of the 2nd Duke
 Jane Warburton (died 1767), 2nd wife of the 2nd Duke
 Anne Whitfield, wife of the 3rd Duke
 Mary Drummond Ker, wife of the 4th Duke
 Elizabeth Gunning (1733–1790), wife of the 5th Duke
 Lady Caroline Villiers (1774–1835), wife of the 6th Duke
 Anne Cunninghame (died 1874), 3rd wife of the 7th Duke
 Lady Elizabeth Leveson-Gower (1824–1878), 1st wife of the 8th Duke
 Amelia Claughton (1843-1894), 2nd wife of the 8th Duke 
 Ina McNeill (1843-1925), 3rd wife of the 8th Duke
 Princess Louise (1848–1939), wife of the 9th Duke
 Louise Vanneck (1904–1970), 2nd wife of the 11th Duke
 Margaret Whigham (1912–1993), 3rd wife of the 11th Duke
 Mathilda Mortimer (1925–1997), 4th wife of the 11th Duke
 Iona Colquhoun (born 1945), wife of the 12th Duke
 Eleanor Cadbury (born 1973), wife of the 13th Duke

Peerage of the United Kingdom (1892)
 Ina McNeill (1843-1925), 3rd wife of the 8th Duke
 Princess Louise (1848–1939), wife of the 9th Duke
 Louise Vanneck (1904–1970), 2nd wife of the 11th Duke
 Margaret Whigham (1912–1993), 3rd wife of the 11th Duke
 Mathilda Mortimer (1925–1997), 4th wife of the 11th Duke
 Iona Colquhoun (born 1945), wife of the 12th Duke
 Eleanor Cadbury (born 1973), wife of the 13th Duke

References